The women's pentathlon event at the 2003 IAAF World Indoor Championships was held on March 14.

Medalists

Results

60 metres hurdles

High jump

Shot put

Long jump

800 metres

Final results

References
Results

Pentathlon
Combined events at the World Athletics Indoor Championships
2003 in women's athletics